Braine-le-Comte is a railway station in the town of Braine-le-Comte, Hainaut, Belgium. The station opened on 31 October 1841 and is located on the 96, 117 and 123. The train services are operated by National Railway Company of Belgium (NMBS).

Train services
The station is served by the following services:

Intercity services (IC-06A) Mons - Braine-le-Comte - Brussels - Brussels Airport
Intercity services (IC-11) Binche - Braine-le-Comte - Halle - Brussels - Mechelen - Turnhout (weekdays)
Intercity services (IC-14) Quiévrain - Mons - Braine-le-Comte - Halle - Brussels - Leuven - Liege (weekdays)
Intercity services (IC-22) Binche - Braine-le-Comte - Halle - Brussels - Mechelen - Antwerp (weekends)
Local services (L-04) Jurbise - Braine-le-Comte (weekdays)
Local services (L-19) Braine-le-Comte - Ecaussinnes - Manage (weekdays)
Brussels RER services (S2) Braine-le-Comte - Halle - Brussels - Leuven

See also
 List of railway stations in Belgium

References

External links
 
 Braine-le-Comte railway station at Belgian Railways website

Railway stations in Belgium
Railway stations in France opened in 1841
Railway stations in Hainaut (province)